Triphoridae is a family of very small sea snails, marine gastropod molluscs in the informal group  Ptenoglossa, within the clade Hypsogastropoda.  Almost all the species in this family are micromollusks and almost all are left-handed in shell-coiling.

Distribution
Species of this family can be found worldwide, but the major part occurs in the Indo-Pacific Region. Most species live  between the intertidal zone and offshore to a depth between 200 m to 500 mm (exceptionally below 1,000 m).

Shell description
The shells of triphorids are small (between 2 mm and 10 mm - exceptionally 50 mm) and extremely high-spired, with numerous narrow whorls which often have distinctive sculpture. The majority of species in this family are left-handed or sinistral.

Taxonomy 
Facts about their taxonomy are rather scant, complicated by the high diversity and the intra- and inter-specific variability of the species. Most triphorid collections available in Museums of Natural History are still undescribed. 

The following subfamilies were recognized in the taxonomy of Bouchet & Rocroi of 2005:
Iniforinae Kosuge, 1966
Metaxiinae Marshall, 1977
Triphorinae Gray, 1847

Gründel (1975), stated that the correct family name is Triforidae Jousseaume, 1884 and not Triphoridae, but this is only true when the genera Triforis and Triphora are placed in the same family (Kosuge, 1976). Marshall (1980) however stated that the two genera need to be placed in two different families: the Triforidae and the Triphoridae. WoRMS do not recognise these 3 subfamilies and consider them alternative representation of Triphoridae.

Genera
Genera within the family Triphoridae include:

 Aclophora Laseron, 1958
 Aclophoropsis Marshall, 1983
 Bouchetriphora Marshall, 1983
 Cautor Finlay, 1927
 Cautotriphora Laws, 1940
 Cheirodonta Marshall, 1983
 Coriophora Laseron, 1958
 Cosmotriphora Olsson and Harbison, 1953
 Costatophora B. A. Marshall, 1994 
 Differoforis Kosuge, 2008
 Euthymella Thiele, 1929
 Eutriphora Cotton & Godfrey, 1931
 Hedleytriphora Marshall, 1983
 Hypotriphora Cotton & Godfrey, 1931
 Inella Bayle, 1879
 Iniforis Jousseaume, 1884
 Isotriphora Cotton & Godfrey, 1931
 Latitriphora Marshall, 1983
 Liniphora Laseron, 1958
 Litharium Dall, 1924
 Magnosinister Laseron, 1954
 Marshallora Bouchet, 1985
 Mastonia Hinds, 1843
 Mastoniaeforis Jousseaume, 1884
 Metaxia Monterosato, 1884
 Monophorus Grillo, 1877
 Nanaphora Laseron, 1958
 Nototriphora Marshall, 1983
 Obesula Jousseaume, 1897
 Opimaphora Laseron, 1958
 Pogonodon Bouchet, 1997
 Sagenotriphora B.A. Marshall, 1983
 Seilarex Iredale, 1924
 Similiphora Bouchet, 1985
 Strobiligera Dall, 1924
 Subulophora Laseron, 1958
 Sychar Hinds, 1843
 Talophora Gründel, 1975
 Teretriphora Finlay, 1927
 Triphora Blainville, 1828
 Viriola Jousseaume, 1884
 Viriolopsis Marshall, 1983

 Genera brought into synonymy 
 Biforina Bucquoy, Dautzenberg & Dollfus, 1884 : synonym of Monophorus Grillo, 1877
 Brucetriphora Beu, 2004: synonym of Costatophora B. A. Marshall, 1994
 Distophora Laseron, 1958:synonym of Cautor Finlay, 1927
 Epiforis Laseron, 1958:synonym of Mastoniaeforis Jousseaume, 1884
 Euthymia Jousseaume, 1884:synonym of Euthymella Thiele, 1929
 Ino Hinds, 1843:synonym of Inella Bayle, 1879
 Macrosinister:synonym of Magnosinister Laseron, 1954
 Mastoniaeformis [sic] : synonym of Mastoniaeforis Jousseaume, 1884
 Mesophora Laseron, 1958: synonym of Coriophora Laseron, 1958
 Notosinister Finlay, 1926: synonym of Monophorus Grillo, 1877
 Orbitophora Laseron, 1958:synonym of Viriola Jousseaume, 1884
 Risbecia  Kosuge, 1966:synonym of Differoforis Kosuge, 2008
 Sinistroseila W. R. B. Oliver, 1915: synonym of Viriola Jousseaume, 1884
 Solosinister Laseron, 1954:synonym of Viriola Jousseaume, 1884
 Tetraphora  Laseron, 1958:synonym of Brucetriphora Beu, 2004
 Torresophora Laseron, 1958: synonym of Euthymella Thiele, 1929
 Triforis Deshayes, 1834:synonym of Triphora Blainville, 1828
 Triphoris:synonym of Triphora Blainville, 1828

References

 Fernandes M..R., Pimenta A.D. & Leal J.H., 2013. Taxonomic review of Triphorinae (Gastropoda: Triphoridae) from the Vitoria-Trindade Seamount Chain, southeastern Brazil. The Nautilus 127(1): 1-18

External links
  Serge GOFAS, Ángel A. LUQUE, Joan Daniel OLIVER,José TEMPLADO & Alberto SERRA (2021) - The Mollusca of Galicia Bank (NE Atlantic Ocean); European Journal of Taxonomy 785: 1–114

 
Taxa named by John Edward Gray